Transtillaspis plagifascia is a species of moth of the family Tortricidae. It is found in Ecuador in Tungurahua, Azuay and Loja provinces.

The wingspan is 14.5–18 mm for males and 17-23.5 mm for females. The ground colour of the forewings is greyish, sprinkled and dotted with brownish grey. The markings are greyish brown with browner spots between the veins. The hindwings are whitish creamy, strigulated (finely streaked) with pale brownish grey.

Etymology
The species name refers to the forewing markings and is derived from Greek plagios (meaning oblique) and Latin fascia (meaning fascia).

References

Moths described in 2005
Transtillaspis
Moths of South America
Taxa named by Józef Razowski